The Columbus, Ohio, mayoral election of 1943 saw the election of Jim Rhodes.

Primary election
The primary as held on August 10.

General election
The general election was held on November 2.

See also
List of mayors of Columbus, Ohio

References

Mayoral elections in Columbus, Ohio
Columbus
Columbus mayoral
20th century in Columbus, Ohio